This are the results of 2015 BWF World Senior Championships' 35+ events.

Medalist

Men's singles

Seeds

 Vadim Itckov (quarterfinals)
 Stanislav Pukhov (champion, gold medal)
 Anders Boesen (semifinals, bronze medal)
 Tjitte Weistra (quarterfinals)
 Thomas Blondeau (third round)
 Thorsten Hukriede (final, silver medal)
 Lars Klintrup (third round)
 Konstantin Myakishev (second round)
 Jim Ronny Andersen (semifinals, bronze medal)
 Naruenart Chuaymak (quarterfinals)
 Oliver Colin (third round)
 Jeffer Rosobin (quarterfinals)
 Rohan Kapoor (third round)
 Eric Wasylyk (first round)
 Andreas Borella (quarterfinals)
 Morten Rasmussen (third round)

Finals

Top half

Section 1

Section 2

Bottom half

Section 3

Section 4

Women's singles

Seeds

 Claudia Vogelgsang (semifinals, bronze medal)
 Rebecca Pantaney (champion, gold medal)
 Aurélie Martin (third round)
 Noriko Sanada (semifinals, bronze medal)
 Ingrid Marie Holst Olsen (second round)
 Katja Wengberg (third round)
 Katrin Hockemeyer (second round)
 Kazumi Ichinohe (quarterfinals)

Finals

Top half

Section 1

Section 2

Bottom half

Section 3

Section 4

Men's doubles

Seeds

 Tony Gunawan /  Flandy Limpele (champions, gold medal)
 Xavier Engrand / Jérôme Krawczyk (third round)
 Anders Boesen / Andreas Borella (semifinals, bronze medal)
 Fredrik du Hane /  Lars Klintrup (second round)
 Andrey Degtyarev / Vadim Itckov (quarterfinals)
 Jan-Lennard Hay / Ingo Waltermann (third round)
 Honzawa Yutaka / Matsumoto Masayuki (third round)
 Daniel Plant / Philip Troke (second round)

Finals

Top half

Section 1

Section 2

Bottom half

Section 3

Section 4
{{16TeamBracket-Compact-Tennis3-Byes 
| RD1=First Round
| RD2=Second Round
| RD3=Third Round
| RD4=Quarterfinals

| team-width=150

| RD1-seed01=
| RD1-team01= N Ludvigsson T Nielsen
| RD1-score01-1=23
| RD1-score01-2=15
| RD1-score01-3=16
| RD1-seed02=
| RD1-team02= N Chuaymak A Thiraratsakul
| RD1-score02-1=21
| RD1-score02-2=21
| RD1-score02-3=21

| RD1-seed05=
| RD1-team05= J R Anderson E Lund
| RD1-score05-1=21
| RD1-score05-2=21
| RD1-score05-3=
| RD1-seed06=
| RD1-team06= R Jareño J Waeyenbergh
| RD1-score06-1=7
| RD1-score06-2=4
| RD1-score06-3=

| RD1-seed09=
| RD1-team09= E B. Kæmpegaard M Rasmussen| RD1-score09-1=21
| RD1-score09-2=21
| RD1-score09-3=
| RD1-seed10=
| RD1-team10= N Kanebäck R Wettersten
| RD1-score10-1=15
| RD1-score10-2=11
| RD1-score10-3=

| RD1-seed13=
| RD1-team13= Inoki V Wibowo
| RD1-score13-1=21
| RD1-score13-2=21
| RD1-score13-3=
| RD1-seed14=
| RD1-team14= M Gloria P Gomes
| RD1-score14-1=13
| RD1-score14-2=1
| RD1-score14-3=

| RD2-seed01=
| RD2-team01= N Chuaymak A Thiraratsakul
| RD2-score01-1=21
| RD2-score01-2=16
| RD2-score01-3=21
| RD2-seed02=
| RD2-team02= J. B. S. Vidyadhar R Singh
| RD2-score02-1=11
| RD2-score02-2=21
| RD2-score02-3=15

| RD2-seed03=
| RD2-team03= J R Anderson E Lund
| RD2-score03-1=21
| RD2-score03-2=20
| RD2-score03-3=13
| RD2-seed04=6
| RD2-team04= J-L Hay I Waltermann
| RD2-score04-1=14
| RD2-score04-2=22
| RD2-score04-3=21

| RD2-seed05=
| RD2-team05= E B. Kæmpegaard M Rasmussen
| RD2-score05-1=21
| RD2-score05-2=13
| RD2-score05-3=22
| RD2-seed06=
| RD2-team06= A Katkov S Pukhov
| RD2-score06-1=14
| RD2-score06-2=21
| RD2-score06-3=20

| RD2-seed07=
| RD2-team07= Inoki V Wibowo
| RD2-score07-1=19
| RD2-score07-2=12
| RD2-score07-3=
| RD2-seed08=2
| RD2-team08= X Engrand J Krawczyk
| RD2-score08-1=21
| RD2-score08-2=21
| RD2-score08-3=

| RD3-seed01=
| RD3-team01= N Chuaymak A Thiraratsakul
| RD3-score01-1=21
| RD3-score01-2=22
| RD3-score01-3=
| RD3-seed02=6
| RD3-team02= J-L Hay I Waltermann
| RD3-score02-1=11
| RD3-score02-2=20
| RD3-score02-3=

| RD3-seed03=
| RD3-team03= E B. Kæmpegaard M Rasmussen
| RD3-score03-1=21
| RD3-score03-2=15
| RD3-score03-3=21
| RD3-seed04=2
| RD3-team04= X Engrand J Krawczyk
| RD3-score04-1=18
| RD3-score04-2=21
| RD3-score04-3=16

| RD4-seed01=
| RD4-team01= N Chuaymak A Thiraratsakul
| RD4-score01-1=21
| RD4-score01-2=22
| RD4-score01-3=
| RD4-seed02=
| RD4-team02= E B. Kæmpegaard M Rasmussen
| RD4-score02-1=11
| RD4-score02-2=20
| RD4-score02-3=
}}

Women's doubles
Seeds

 Rebecca Pantaney / Lynne Swan (semifinals, bronze medal)
 Kazumi Ichinohe / Noriko Sanada (champions, gold medal)
 Svetlana Alferova / Maria Kurochkina (second round) Sunniva Aminoff /  Claudia Vogelgsang (final, silver medal)
 Chen Hua-wei / Chen Yu-fang (semifinals, bronze medal)
 Manuela Nowak / Simone Weisbarth (first round) Ewelina Bracha / Małgorzata Średnicka (first round) Natalija Holowkina /  Tatiana Ianutc (quarterfinals)Finals

Top half
Section 1

Section 2

Bottom half
Section 3

Section 4

Mixed doubles
Seeds

 Maurice Niesner / Claudia Vogelgsang (semifinals, bronze medal)
 Nick Ponting / Lynne Swan (quarterfinals) Thorsten Hukriede / Michaela Hukriede (final, silver medal)
 Stanislav Pukhov / Maria Kurochkina (third round) Vadim Itchkov / Natalia Blokhina (third round) Matsumoto Masayuki / Rie Matsumoto (quarterfinals) Roy Rouwhorst / Georgy Van Soerland-Trouerbach (quarterfinals)'' Tommy Sørensen / Lisbeth T. Haagensen (champions, gold medal)'''

Finals

Top half

Section 1

Section 2

Bottom half

Section 3

Section 4

References

2015 BWF World Senior Championships